Joe Volk is an English musician and songwriter from Bristol now based in Bern, Switzerland. He was lyricist and singer with the bands Gonga and Crippled Black Phoenix, and is a solo recording artist.

Solo
As a solo artist, Volk was first signed to Invada Records and released his debut album Derwent Waters Saint in 2006. The album was recorded, engineered and produced by Adrian Utley, guitarist with the band Portishead. In December 2012, Volk released a split 12" EP on Invada Records with the experimental Japanese band Boris.

In 2015, Volk signed to Glitterhouse Records and released his second solo album Happenings and Killings in February 2016. The album was produced by Volk, with additional production and orchestration by Emmy-nominated composer Ben Salisbury along with Geoff Barrow. To support Happenings and Killings, Volk toured Germany in early 2017 with a new live band he formed with drummer Thys Bucher and bassist Jürg Schmidhauser. Together the three musicians wrote new material for his third album Primitive Energetics, released in April 2020 under the name Joe Volk + Naiare.

Bands
He was first signed to Invada Records in 2003 as the singer with extreme hard rock band Gonga. Volk left the band in 2007 after writing and releasing two albums. Volk was the original singer and lyricist in Crippled Black Phoenix, a band founded by Justin Greaves in 2004. He left the band in 2012 after releasing five studio albums, one live album and one EP with the band.

Discography

Albums

Extended plays

Official videos

 "Call to Sun" (2012)
 "Soliloquy" (2015)
 "These Feathers Count" (2016)
 "Whitesheet" (2020)

With Gonga

 Gonga (2003)
 II: Transmigration (2008)

With Crippled Black Phoenix

 Sharks & Storms / Blizzard of Horned Cats (2006)
 A Love of Shared Disasters (2007)
 The Resurrectionists (2009)
 Night Raider (2009)
 I, Vigilante (2010)
 (Mankind) The Crafty Ape (2012)
 Poznan 2011 A.D. (2012)

Other
He is the Great Grandson of electrical engineer and inventor Magnus Volk.

See also
 List of bands from Bristol
 Culture of Bristol

References

External links
 Official Joe Volk website
 Official Glitterhouse Records website
 
 
 

English folk musicians
Living people
Year of birth missing (living people)
Glitterhouse Records artists
Musicians from Bristol